Dean Monogenis is a Greek American painter and sculptor. In his work he creates architectural settings  using a variety of techniques which result in added lines, edges and textures. Architecture became a key theme in Monogenis' work shortly after 911. "Watching the World Trade Center towers come down I realized that buildings, like people, were fated to a similar cycle of life and death."

Education
Monogenis Attended Skidmore College and graduated from the School of the Art Institute of Chicago, BFA.

Solo exhibitions
Monogenis has shown his work internationally at galleries including: Galerie Xippas: Paris, Geneva, Montevideo, and Athens, Baronian, Brussels; Stux Gallery, NYC; CCA Andratx, Spain; and the Walter Maciel Gallery, Los Angeles

Group exhibitions
His works have also been exhibited in galleries and museums including: Musée d'art moderne (Saint-Étienne), Pavillon de l'Arsenal, Neuberger Museum of Art, Santa Monica Museum of Art, CCA Andratx, Wave Hill, Federal Reserve Board of Governors, Mykonos Biennale, Angels Gate Cultural Center, Herter Art Gallery, University of Massachusetts, Bedford Gallery at the Lesher Center for the Arts, Schneider Museum of Art, Hunterdon Art Museum.

Artists he has exhibited with include: Jules de Balincourt, Takis, Darren Almond, Vik Muniz, François Morellet, Daniel Buren, and Peter Halley  among others.

Monogenis' work has been exhibited in international art fairs including: FIAC, BRAFA (Art Brussels), VOLTA, Artgenève

Awards
Monogenis was awarded:
The Artist in the Market Place (AIM) Program from the Bronx Museum of the Arts (Bronx, NY, USA)., FLOW 14 Art at Randall's Island, (Randall's Island Park, NYC, USA)., Visiting Artist Anderson Ranch,(Snowmass, Colorado, USA)

Artist in residence
Monogenis has twice held the position Artist in Residence at Spain's CCA Andratx Art Centre (in 2012 and 2016) The Fountainhead Residency, Miami, New York's Pace University, Dyson College of Arts and Sciences.

Further reading
The Precision of Nowhere  artist monograph with text by Ara H. Merjian and interview with Walter Maciel

References

Living people
1973 births
21st-century American painters
21st-century American sculptors
21st-century American male artists
School of the Art Institute of Chicago alumni